Events from the year 1897 in France.

Incumbents
President: Félix Faure
President of the Council of Ministers: Jules Méline

Events
 4 May – Bazar de la Charité Fire.
 9 December – First issue of the feminist newspaper La Fronde is published by Marguerite Durand.
 Alexandre Darracq begins manufacture of motor vehicles at A. Darracq et Cie in the Paris suburb of Suresnes.

Arts and literature
 At Giverny, Claude Monet begins painting his Water Lilies series, which will continue until the end of his life.
 28 December – The play Cyrano de Bergerac, by Edmond Rostand, premieres in Paris.

Births

January to June
 21 January – René Iché, sculptor (died 1954)
 30 March – Raymond Borderie, film producer (died 1982)
 4 April – Pierre Fresnay, actor (died 1975)
 1 May – Aimée Antoinette Camus, botanist (died 1965)
 27 May – Lucien Cailliet, composer, conductor, arranger and clarinetist (died 1985)

July to September
 3 July – Charles Tillon, politician (died 1993)
 25 July – André Muffang, chess master (died 1989)
 2 August – Philippe Soupault, poet, novelist, critic and political activist (died 1990)
 19 August – Norbert Casteret, caver and adventurer (died 1987)
 10 September – Georges Bataille, writer (died 1962)
 12 September
 Pierre Courant, politician (died 1965)
 Irène Joliot-Curie, scientist, shared the Nobel Prize for chemistry in 1935 (died 1956)
 13 September – Michel Saint-Denis, actor, theatre director, and drama theorist (died 1971)

October to December
 3 October – Louis Aragon, poet and novelist (died 1982)
 16 October – Louis de Cazenave, at the time of his death, the oldest French poilu still alive (died 2008)
 18 October – Martha Desrumeaux, militant communist and member of the French Resistance (died 1982)
 24 November – François Ducaud-Bourget, priest (died 1984)
 27 November – André Couder, optician and astronomer (died 1979)
 3 December – André Marie, politician and Prime Minister of France (died 1974)
 7 December – Lazare Ponticelli, last surviving official French veteran of the First World War (died 2008)
 19 December – Louis Darquier de Pellepoix, Commissioner for Jewish Affairs under the Vichy Régime (died 1980)
 20 December – Jacques de Bernonville, collaborationist and senior police officer in the Vichy regime (died 1972)
 25 December – Noël Delberghe, water polo player and Olympic medallist (died 1965)

Undated
 Georges Périnal, cinematographer (died 1965)

Deaths
 13 January – Charles Brun, naval engineer (born 1821)
 20 March – Augustin Marie Morvan, physician, politician and writer (born 1819)
 18 May – François-Louis Français, painter (born 1814)
 30 May – Jeanne Sylvanie Arnould-Plessy, actress (born 1819)
 19 June – Louis Brière de l'Isle, Military officer and colonial governor (born 1827)
 5 July – Edmond-Frederic Le Blant, archaeologist and historian (born 1818)
 6 July – Henri Meilhac, dramatist and opera librettist (born 1830)
 20 September – Louis Pierre Mouillard, aeronautical engineer (born 1834)
 30 September – Thérèse de Lisieux, Roman Catholic Carmelite nun, canonised as a saint (born 1873)
 6 November – Edouard Deldevez, violinist, conductor and composer (born 1817)
 14 November – Thomas W. Evans, dentist (born 1823 in the United States)
 28 November – Léonard-Léopold Forgemol de Bostquénard, general (born 1821)
 6 December – Oscar Bardi de Fourtou, politician (born 1836)
 16 December – Alphonse Daudet, novelist (born 1840)

References

1890s in France